Jaresqan (also Romanized as Jaresqān; also known as Jers̄oqān) is a village in Qarah Bagh Rural District, in the Central District of Shiraz County, Fars Province, Iran. At the 2006 census, its population was 1,539, in 364 families.

References 

Populated places in Shiraz County